Themistokli Dervi Avenue, is a major shopping street located in the centre of Nicosia, Cyprus. The avenue hosts a number of internationally prestigious brands. It also includes numerous cafeterias and restaurants. It has been categorised as one of the most famous avenues in the Eastern Mediterranean region with an exceptional development in the past five years. There are three parking places beside the avenue. It also hosts the headquarters of Piraeus Bank Cyprus (formerly Arab Bank).

Photogallery

References 

Streets in Nicosia